Eric Braeden (born Hans-Jörg Gudegast; April 3, 1941) is a German-born film and television actor, known for his roles as Victor Newman on the CBS soap opera The Young and the Restless, as Hans Dietrich in the 1960s TV series The Rat Patrol, Dr. Charles Forbin in Colossus: The Forbin Project, and as John Jacob Astor IV in the 1997 film Titanic. He won a Daytime Emmy Award in 1998 for Lead Actor in a Drama Series for the role of Victor Newman.

Early life
Braeden was born Hans-Jörg Gudegast in Bredenbek, Germany (near Kiel), a small village in northern Germany where his father was once mayor. In his autobiography, titled I'll Be Damned, published by Harper Collins in 2017, Braeden  revealed that he was a survivor of the MV Wilhelm Gustloff sinking. The MV Wilhelm Gustloff was a German armed military transport ship which was sunk on January 30, 1945 by Soviet submarine S-13, in the Baltic Sea, while evacuating German civilian and military refugees. It is estimated that 9,400 people died. It was the largest loss of life in a single ship sinking in history. He emigrated to the United States in 1959, and attended the University of Montana, Missoula.

Career
Braeden accumulated many TV and film credits during his first two decades in America, and guest-starred in 120 roles. His earliest credits were all under his birth name, Hans Gudegast.

During the 1960s he appeared in several episodes of TV's longest-running World War II drama (1962–1967) Combat!, always playing a German soldier. In 1965, he appeared in a film called Morituri starring Marlon Brando and Yul Brynner, and guest-starred in The Man From U.N.C.L.E. as T.H.R.U.S.H. agent Mr. Oakes in "The Discotheque Affair"; season two, episode five.

In 1966, he guest-starred as Luftwaffe Major Bentz in episode 28, "Day of Reckoning", of season two of the TV series Twelve O'Clock High (a series which was very loosely based on the classic 1949 war film with the same name) and also appeared in an episode of the 1966 espionage drama series Blue Light.  His main character for the next two years was his regular starring role playing German Hauptmann (Captain) Hans Dietrich on the TV series The Rat Patrol (1966–1968),

He starred in the 1969 western 100 Rifles with Raquel Welch, Burt Reynolds and Jim Brown (noted for the first big-screen interracial love scene between Welch and Brown), once again playing a villainous German military officer opposite Fernando Lamas. This was his last credit under his birth name.

His starring role in the movie Colossus: The Forbin Project (1970), was when he first took the stage name of Eric Braeden. Lew Wasserman of Universal Pictures told him that no one would be allowed to star in an American film if he or she had a German name. After much thought, he took the name Braeden from his hometown of Bredenbek.

Other movie appearances in the 1970s included the role of Dr. Otto Hasslein in Escape from the Planet of the Apes (1971), and that of  the arrogant but formidable race car driver, Bruno von Stickle in Walt Disney's 1977 Herbie Goes to Monte Carlo.  Throughout the 1970s, he also guest-starred in a variety of television shows including The Six Million Dollar Man, Wonder Woman, and The Mary Tyler Moore Show, and also appeared in several episodes of the long-running CBS western series Gunsmoke.

In addition to many episodic roles, Braeden also appeared as Colonel John Jacob Astor IV in the 1997 blockbuster film Titanic.

Victor Newman 
In 1980, he was offered the role of self-made business magnate Victor Newman on the daytime soap opera The Young and the Restless. Initially, the role was for a 26-week run. His character imprisoned his wife's lover, and became so popular the character became a love-to-hate villain, and his contract was extended.

Braeden won a Daytime Emmy for his work in 1998.  In February 2017 he celebrated his 37th anniversary with the show. In 2020, the show marked Braeden's 40th anniversary as Victor onscreen.

In October 2009, Braeden and The Young and the Restless came to an impasse regarding contract negotiations, and press reports indicated he might leave the show. However, CBS later announced that Braeden had inked a new three-year deal and would remain with the show, agreeing to a reduction in salary, which was the original issue.

Personal life
In 1958 Braeden, under his birth name Hans-Jörg Gudegast, won the German National Team Championship in Track and Field (discus, shot-put and javelin with the Rendsburger TSV). Braeden later went on to win the 1973 National Challenge Cup as a fullback with the Jewish American soccer club Maccabi Los Angeles, scoring the winning goal in the semifinal game and a penalty kick in the championship game against Chicago Croatian. In the 1970s/80s he could often be seen boxing at the Hoover Street and Broadway gyms in L.A. He is a tennis player and has participated in many celebrity events. 

He married his college sweetheart Dale Russell in 1966. His son, Christian, is a director who created the film Den of Thieves, starring Gerard Butler.

Filmography

Awards and nominations

See also
Victor Newman and Nikki Reed
Supercouple
Distinguished German-American of the Year

References

External links

 
 
 
 Interview with Eric Braeden. Accessed February 11, 2017

1941 births
20th-century German male actors
21st-century German male actors
Commanders Crosses of the Order of Merit of the Federal Republic of Germany
Daytime Emmy Award for Outstanding Lead Actor in a Drama Series winners
Daytime Emmy Award winners
German emigrants to the United States
German male film actors
German male soap opera actors
German male television actors
Living people
People from Rendsburg-Eckernförde
People from the Province of Schleswig-Holstein
Shipwreck survivors
University of Montana alumni
Western (genre) television actors
American soccer players